Fluorofentanyl may refer to:

 4-Fluorofentanyl, fluorination on the phenyl ring
 NFEPP, fluorination on the piperidine ring
 Orthofluorofentanyl (o-fluorofentanyl)